Events of 2020 in Zimbabwe.

Incumbents
President: Emmerson Mnangagwa
Vice President: Constantino Chiwenga (1st), Kembo Mohadi (2nd)

Events
March 20 – 1st case of the COVID-19 pandemic in Zimbabwe
July 30 – The United Nations' World Food Programme (WFP) seeks an additional $250 million USD for emergency relief after COVID-19 exacerbates the country's hunger crisis. The WFP reported the number of food-insecure people to soar to 8.6 million or about 60% of the population.
September 2 – The cadavers of twelve elephants are discovered in the Tinashe Farawo National Park, possibly poisoned.
December 29 – Zimbabwe bans the use of mercury (Hg) in mining after ratifying the Minamata Convention on Mercury.

Holidays

January 1 – New Year's Day
February 21 – Robert Gabriel Mugabe National Youth Day
April 10 – Good Friday
April 13 – Easter Monday
April 18 – Independence Day, from the Commonwealth of Nations and the Republic of Zimbabwe formed in 1980.
May 1 – Workers' Day
May 25 – Africa Day
August 10 – Heroes' Day, honors those who died during the liberation war.
August 11 – Devence Forces Day
December 22 – Unity Day, honors peace agreement of 1987
December 25 – Christmas

Deaths
February 15 – Prince Kudakwashe Musarurwa, singer; lung cancer
March 23 – Zororo Makamba, journalist; Coronavirus
April 28 – Peter Jones, radio personality
29 July – Perrance Shiri, politician; COVID-19
August 26 – Patson Dzamara, political activist; colon cancer
September 27 – Delroy Maripakwenda [Scara], musician 
October 24 – CalVin, 35, singer and rapper; traffic collision.
November 8 – Genius Kadungure [Ginimbi], businessman and socialite; car crash 
November 8 – Mitchelle Amuli [Mimi Moana], actress and socialite; car crash 
November 9 – Lazarus Boora [Gringo], actor
December 29 – Richard Choruma, 42, Zimbabwean footballer (Highlanders, Bloemfontein Celtic, national team); kidney failure.

See also

COVID-19 pandemic in Zimbabwe
COVID-19 pandemic in Africa
2020 in East Africa
2020 in Botswana
2020 in South Africa
2020 in Mozambique
2020 in Zambia

References

 
2020s in Zimbabwe
Years of the 21st century in Zimbabwe
Zimbabwe